Matthew Burns (c. 1976 – 21 February 2002) was a drug dealer shot dead by the IRA.

Background
A native of Castlewellan, County Down, Burns was a fitness disciple, and kick-boxed with Northern Ireland's tae kwon do academy. He was a participant in a campaign to have tae kwon do listed as an Olympic sport, and hoped to compete in the  Olympics himself. He was also described as a drug dealer, and had been linked to a plot to import heroin into Northern Ireland, along with an accomplice, Frankie Mulholland, shot dead by loyalists in 2002.

Dispute with the IRA
Between late 1999 and early 2000, he became involved with a dispute against local members of the Provisional Irish Republican Army (IRA), including its commander. This is believed to have led to an incident where the IRA commander led a group of seven men to administer a punishment beating on Burns in John F. Kennedy Park. According to an article in the Irish Independent:

Burns was afterwards the subject of a booby-trap bomb placed on his car at the house of the mother of his girlfriend. While Burns was uninjured, his pregnant girlfriend received a leg injury. She later gave birth to the couple's only child.

Second IRA attack
Burns and his brother Patrick were leaving their mother's home in Rathfriland on 21 February 2002 in  Castlewellan, County Down. when "a gunman opened fire with a high-powered assault shotgun, an Italian-manufactured weapon that fires steel ball bearings with destructive power. The first blast disabled the car engine. The second, fired at point-blank range, tore through Matthew's chest and neck. Two of the steel pellets hit Patrick in the hand and arm."

The Police Service of Northern Ireland reportedly believe Burns was shot by a member of the Real IRA "nearby Kilcoo, brought in by the local Provisional IRA boss to carry out the assassination." Several other people are believed to have been involved.

Aftermath
Patrick Burns died on 9 December 2003. Another brother, Sean, received a death threat from the IRA, forcing him into exile. After his death, "stories that he was a drug dealer with links to loyalists" were reportedly disseminated. were claimed to be deliberate vilification by republicans seeking to justify the murder, and refuted by the PSNI at an inquest in November 2004.

Burns' grave was regularly desecrated and his remains were re-interred elsewhere.

Andrew Burns
Matthew Burns was unrelated to Andrew Burns, killed by the IRA in County Donegal in 2008.

See also
 Murder of Robert McCartney
 Murder of Gareth O'Connor
 Murder of Joseph Rafferty

References

External links
 Rte.ie
 Conspiracy of Silence Over Slaughter of Kickboxer Who Saw Off IRA Thugs @ Independent
 Ceasefire Meant Nothing to Gangs @ Independent
 Cain.ulst.ac.uk

2002 murders in the United Kingdom
2002 in Northern Ireland
Murder in Northern Ireland
Deaths by firearm in Northern Ireland
2000s murders in Northern Ireland